Calchas is a genus of scorpions in the family Iuridae. At least four species in Calchas are described.

Species
 Calchas anlasi Yagmur, Soleglad, Fet & Kovarik, 2013
 Calchas birulai Fet, Soleglad & Kovarik, 2009
 Calchas kosswigi Yagmur, Soleglad, Fet & Kovarik, 2013
 Calchas nordmanni Birula, 1899

References

Further reading

 
 
 

Scorpion genera